RIP 23 (route d’intérêt provincial 23) is an unpaved, secondary road in the region of Alaotra-Mangoro, Madagascar. It is only suitable for 4x4 driven cars.

See also
List of roads in Madagascar
Transport in Madagascar

References

Roads in Alaotra-Mangoro
Roads in Madagascar